is a Japanese actress. Her son is actor Takehiro Hira.

In 1957, Sakuma was scouted and signed her contract with Toei film company. Following year she made her film debut with Utsukushiki Shimai no Monogatari Modaeru Soshun. In 1970, she married actor Mikijirō Hira but divorced in 1984. Sakuma landed lead role in the 1981 Taiga drama Onna Taikōki.

Selected filmography

Film
Kiiroi Fudo (1961)
The G-Men of the Pacific (1962)
Gang vs. G-Men (1962) as Akiko Mizuno
Gang 6 (1963)
Gobanchō yūgirirō (1963)
Jinsei gekijo: hisha kaku (1963)
Kaoyaku (1965)
Lake of Teras (1966) as Saku
Samurai Banners (1969) as Princess Yu
Chōkōsō no Akebono (1969)
Men and War (1970)
Byoinzaka no Kubikukuri no Ie (1979)
The Makioka Sisters (1983)
Genji Monogatari: Sennen no Nazo (2012) as Myobu
Earthquake Bird (2019) as Yamamoto

Television
Shin Heike Monogatari (1972) as Taira no Tokuko
Onna Taikōki (1981) as Nene
Kōmyō ga Tsuji (2006) as Hōshūin

Honours 
Order of the Rising Sun, 4th Class, Gold Rays with Rosette (2012)

References

External links
 

1939 births
Living people
People from Tokyo
Actresses from Tokyo
Japanese film actresses
Japanese television actresses
Taiga drama lead actors
Recipients of the Order of the Rising Sun, 4th class